Mobarakeh Rural District is in the Central District of Marvast County, Yazd province, Iran. At the National Census of 2016, the constituent villages of the rural district were in Marvast District of Khatam County. After the census, the district was raised to the status of a county and split into two districts: the Central District (as Harabarjan and Mobarakeh Rural Districts) and Isar District. The capital of the new rural district is Mobarakeh, whose population was 360 people in 2016.

References 

Rural Districts of Yazd Province

Populated places in Yazd Province

fa:دهستان مبارکه (مروست)